Johannes Laine (18 April 1866, Viipuri - 10 January 1933; original surname Päätiläinen) was a Finnish educationist, school director and politician. He was a member of the Parliament of Finland from 1913 to 1916, representing the Young Finnish Party. He was later active in the National Progressive Party. He was married to Augusta Laine.

References

1866 births
1933 deaths
Politicians from Vyborg
People from Viipuri Province (Grand Duchy of Finland)
Young Finnish Party politicians
National Progressive Party (Finland) politicians
Members of the Parliament of Finland (1913–16)
University of Helsinki alumni